Vec may mean:

Mathematics:

 vec(A), the vectorization of a matrix A.
 Vec denotes the category of vector spaces over the reals.

Other:
 Venetian language (Vèneto), language code.
 Vecuronium, a muscle relaxant.
 vec, a sentient moravec robot from the Orion's Arm Universe Project (see also Moravec_(robot))

See also
 VEC (disambiguation)